The Devil Is a Woman is a 1935 American romance film directed and photographed by Josef von Sternberg, adapted from the 1898 novel La Femme et le pantin by Pierre Louÿs. The film was based on a screenplay by John Dos Passos, and stars Marlene Dietrich, Lionel Atwill, Cesar Romero, Edward Everett Horton, and Alison Skipworth. The movie is the last of the six Sternberg-Dietrich collaborations for Paramount Pictures.

Plot summary
During Carnival in early-twentieth century Spain, the boulevards of Seville are jammed with revelers wearing grotesque costumes and masks. A detachment of Civil Guards stagger among the masquerading merrymakers, bewildered by the "riotous disorder". A frenzied merriment prevails. Antonio Galvan, a young bourgeois revolutionary home from his exile in Paris to visit his parents, mixes with the crowds while evading the authorities pursuing him. He makes eye contact with the dazzling Concha, who is perched on a float in the parade. She flees into the crowd with Antonio in pursuit, and he is rewarded with a secret note inviting him to meet with her in person that evening.

Antonio has a chance encounter with a friend he has not seen in years, Don Pasqual, a middle-aged aristocrat and former Captain of the Civil Guard. The younger man, consumed with the image of the lovely Concha, asks the older gentleman what he knows of the mysterious girl. Don Pasqual solemnly relates, via a series of flashbacks, the details of a fateful relationship he had with the young temptress, his tale the confession of a man in thrall to the devastating girl. He says Concha subjected him to ridicule and humiliation, manipulating Don Pasqual in the manner of a puppet master, and he could not help but submit. His public prestige and authority were ultimately shattered, and he resigned his commission in disgrace, after which, satisfied with her conquest, Concha flung him aside for a final time.

Don Pasqual says he has not seen Concha for several years, and assures Antonio that any desire he once felt for her is now utterly extinguished. He exhorts the young man to avoid any contact with the temptress, and Antonio vows to heed his warning, but he keeps his date with Concha. He intends to just tell her off and leave, but ends up going to a club with her. While they are there, a note is delivered to Concha from Don Pasqual that declares his undying love for her. She reads the confidential confession to Antonio, who is incensed that his friend misled him. He passionately kisses Concha at the same moment Don Pasqual bursts into their private room. Antonio accuses Don Pasqual of lying to avoid competition for Concha's affections and says he's acting like a fool. Don Pasqual slaps Antonio with a glove, calling him a coward when Antonio says he will forget the insult from his friend, and a duel is arranged. After demonstrating his expert marksmanship with a pistol, Don Pasqual departs. Concha pledges to accompany Antonio to Paris after the duel and Antonio writes farewell letters.

The suitors meet at a secluded location the following morning. Concha tells Don Pasqual that, if he ever loved her, he could not kill "the only man I ever cared for." When the duelists step to their positions, Don Pasqual does not even aim his pistol, something which is not noticed by Antonio until after he fires. Don Pasqual is gravely wounded by Antonio's bullet. The police, notified of the illegal combat, arrive and arrest the fugitive Antonio. Don Pasqual is taken to the hospital.

Concha turns her charms on Governor Paquito to secure Antonio's release from prison, and he somewhat grudgingly issues two passports so Concha and Antonio can escape to Paris. Before reuniting with Antonio, she visits Don Pasqual at the hospital to thank him for sparing Antonio's life. He says his actions were proof of his love for her, but rejects her thanks and refuses to forgive her, so she leaves. She and Antonio make their way to the French border and pass through customs without incident. When their train arrives, Antonio eagerly enters their carriage, but Concha hesitates and then informs the station master that she is not boarding. The shocked Antonio calls to her from the window of the moving train, and she announces she has decided to rejoin Don Pasqual before reentering Spain.

Cast
 Marlene Dietrich as Concha Pérez: A beautiful, piquant, and heartless factory girl who seduces and discards her lovers without remorse – an irresistible femme fatale.
 Lionel Atwill as Captain Don Pasqual Costelar: A middle-aged aristocrat and Captain of the Civil Guard. His conservative exterior conceals powerful salacious impulses.
 Edward Everett Horton as Governor Don Paquito: The despotic commander of Seville's police force, who is responsible for maintaining order during the festivities. He is susceptible to the charms of attractive women.
 Alison Skipworth as Señora Pérez: Concha's scheming mother.
 Cesar Romero as Antonio Galvan: A young bourgeois revolutionary, one step ahead of Seville's police. He is narcissistic, yet good-natured, and lucky with women.
 Don Alvarado as Morenito
 Tempe Pigott as Tuerta
 Luisa Espinel as Gypsy Dancer (uncredited)

Production Notes
When Sternberg embarked upon filming The Devil Is a Woman, Paramount was experiencing falling profits. His latest film, the lavishly produced The Scarlet Empress, had proved unpopular with the public. Devil was completed on February 6, 1935, premiered without fanfare in March, and released to general audiences in May. Incoming production manager Ernst Lubitsch (who was replacing Ben Schulberg) announced that Sternberg's contract with Paramount would not be renewed.

The original title proposed by Sternberg for the film was Caprice Espagnol, a reference to Russian composer Rimsky-Korsakov's orchestral suite Capriccio Espagnol, of which several selections accompany the film. Lubitsch changed the title to The Devil Is a Woman. Sternberg later remarked: "Though Mr. Lubitsch’s poetic intention to suggest altering the sex of the devil was meant to aid in selling the picture, it did not do so."

Approximately seventeen minutes of footage, including a musical number in which Dietrich sang "If It Isn't Pain (It Isn't Love)", was cut from the film, reducing the total running time to 79 minutes.

Presumed for a time to be a lost film, a copy of the work was provided by Sternberg for a screening at the 1959 Venice Film Festival, and The Devil Is a Woman received a limited re-release in 1961.

Reception
On May 5, 1935, The New York Times surprised the studio with a remarkably positive review, describing the film "as the best product of the Dietrich-Sternberg alliance since The Blue Angel."

The Devil Is a Woman is the last of Sternberg's seven quasi-autobiographical films featuring his star and muse, Marlene Dietrich. A box-office failure, panned by most contemporary critics for its perceived "caviar aestheticism and loose morals", the film's highly sophisticated rendering of a conventional romantic conceit left most audiences confused or bored.

Censorship: Spain and US Department of State
Upon its release, the Spanish Embassy issued protests to the US government that led Paramount to withdrawal the film from circulation and destroy available prints. The US Department of State also, with Spanish and American trade agreements in mind, pressured Paramount Pictures to stage a private burning of a "Master Print" of the film for the Spanish Ambassador in Washington D.C. This diplomatic action was widely reported in Europe, but surviving prints of The Devil Is a Woman continued to be screened at domestic and overseas theaters.

In October 1935, Spain formerly requested that Paramount cease international circulation of the film. A portion of the complaint cited a scene that showed "a Civil Guard drinking [alcohol] in a public cafe", and depicting the national police as buffoons, who appeared "ineffectual in curbing the riotous carnival". Studio head Adolph Zukor "agreed to suppress the film" and prints were recalled in November 1935. Sternberg's feature was marked as a film maudit (a cursed film) for many years. The movie was subsequently outlawed in Francoist Spain.

Critical response
The Devil Is a Woman, in its "worldly attitude toward the follies of romantic infatuation" makes a mockery of Hollywood's standard plot devices that prevailed up to that time. Sternberg acknowledged that it was "my last and most unpopular of this series", but Dietrich herself cherished The Devil Is a Woman as her favorite collaboration with Sternberg.

Ostensibly a light romance, the story examines that fate of a self-respecting and urbane older gentleman who foolishly falls in love with a beautiful woman indifferent to his adoration – and suffers for his passion. Sternberg's "grisly" tale is also a precise, unadorned and "heartless parable of man’s eternal humiliation in the sex struggle." Dietrich, as a "devilish" and "devastating" Spanish joie de vivre, brandishes her cruelty with the rejoinder "If you really loved me, you would have killed yourself". The horror and pathos of the Don Pasqual character is that of a man in thrall to a woman who has no intention of satisfying his desires, and who perversely "derives amusement from his own suffering."

Andre Sennwald, daily reviewer at The New York Times in 1935, defended Sternberg, calling the movie "one of the most sophisticated ever produced in America" and praising its "sly urbanity" and  "the striking beauty of its settings and photography." Museum of Modern Art film curator Charles Silver regards The Devil Is a Woman as a veiled confessional of Sternberg's complex relationship with Dietrich. The leading male protagonists bear a striking physical resemblance to the director.

Sternberg leaves the interpretation of Dietrich's Concha a mystery: "One of the most beautifully realized enigmas in the history of cinema." Sternberg's attitude towards his male protagonists is less ambiguous. Both the pathetic old Don Pasqual and the virile young Antonio are regarded more with irony than sympathy: each are "symbols of the endless futility of passion...[t]hey are the last lovers Sternberg postulated for Dietrich’s screen incarnation and their absurdity only marks the death of desire."

Film critic Andrew Sarris described The Devil Is a Woman as the "coldest" of Sternberg's films in its uncompromising, yet humorously cynical, appraisal of romantic self-deception. This, despite the film's "sumptuous surface". Silver remarks upon the film's "diamond-like hardness", where romanticism is trumped by "cynical introspection and fatalism".

On Dietrich's character, Concha Perez, Cecelia Ager, film critic for Variety, was "particularly lucid on the subject":

Sarris summed up the film this way: "Sternberg did not know it at the time, but his sun was setting, and it has never really risen again...Still, as a goodbye to Dietrich, The Devil Is Woman is a more gallant gesture to one's once beloved than Orson Welles’ murderous adieu to Rita Hayworth in The Lady From Shanghai."

Awards and honors
The film won the Award for Best Cinematography at the Venice Film Festival in 1935.

References

Sources 
Malcolm, Derek. 2000. Josef von Sternberg: The Scarlet Empress in The Guardian, May 25, 2000. Retrieved April 14, 2018. https://www.theguardian.com/culture/2000/may/25/artsfeatures
Sennwald, André. 1935. The Devil is A Woman in The New York Times, May 4, 1935. Reprinted in American Movie Critics: An Anthology From The Silents Until Now. p. 85–86. Ed. Phillip Lopate. The Library of America. New York, New York. 
Sarris, Andrew. 1966. The Films of Josef von Sternberg. Museum of Modern Art/Doubleday. New York City.
Stafford, Jeff. 2018. The Devil is A Woman in Turner Movie Classics film review, May 17, 2017. Retrieved on April 14, 2017.  http://www.tcm.com/this-month/article/410471%7C87829/The-Devil-Is-a-Woman.html
The Film Sufi: The Devil is a Woman by Josef von Sternberg (1935) in The Film Sufi, July 22, 2015. Retrieved April 14, 2018.http://www.filmsufi.com/2015/07/the-devil-is-woman-josef-von-sternberg.html

External links
 
 
 
 

1935 films
1930s historical romance films
1935 romantic drama films
American historical romance films
American romantic drama films
American black-and-white films
Films based on French novels
Romantic period films
Films set in Spain
Films set in the 19th century
Paramount Pictures films
Films directed by Josef von Sternberg
Films based on works by Pierre Louÿs
1930s English-language films
1930s American films